Whitburn may refer to:

Places 
 Whitburn, Alberta, Canada
 Whitburn, Tyne and Wear, England
 Whitburn CofE Academy
 Whitburn Colliery
 Whitburn, West Lothian, Scotland
 Whitburn Academy

People 
Denis Whitburn (born 1944), Australian film writer and producer
Joel Whitburn (1939–2022), American music historian
Vanessa Whitburn, radio producer

Other 
 Whitburn Junior F.C.